In English cricket since the first half of the 18th century, various ad hoc teams have been formed for short-term purposes which have been called England (or sometimes "All-England"; i.e., in the sense of "the rest of England") to play against, say, Marylebone Cricket Club (MCC) or an individual county team. The key factor is that they were non-international and there is a significant difference between them and the official England cricket team which takes part in international fixtures. Conceptually, there is evidence of this sort of team being formed, or at least mooted, since the 1730s. They have always been "occasional elevens" but, nevertheless, have invariably been strong sides. A typical example would be a selection consisting of leading players drawn from several county teams.

Origin of the name
The earliest known mention of the concept occurs in a report by the London Evening Post of 7 to 9 September 1734 which states that the London Cricket Club, being "desirous of playing one more match before the season is expired, do challenge to play with any eleven men in England". The challenge excluded members of Croydon Cricket Club, with whom London were in dispute. It is possible that challenges of this sort had been issued previously but no records of them have been found. There had been matches involving, for example, a team representing one county against a team bearing a patron's name and it is possible that teams of the latter type included players from a wide geographical area. In the 1730s, "any eleven men in England" would in practice have come from the southeastern counties only: e.g., Berkshire, Essex, Hampshire, Kent, Middlesex, Surrey, Sussex.

The majority of such teams were simply labelled "England" and sometimes the term "all-England" was used loosely in a generic sense but, strictly speaking, the teams represented "the Rest of England". The "all England" term per se was first used in reports of two Kent v England matches in 1739. The first was at Bromley Common on Monday, 9 July, and billed as "eleven gentlemen of that county (i.e., Kent) and eleven gentlemen from any part of England, exclusive of Kent". Kent, described as "the unconquerable county", won by "a very few notches". The second match was at the Artillery Ground in Bunhill Fields, Finsbury on Monday, 23 July. This game was drawn and a report includes the phrase "eleven picked out of all (sic) England". Top-level cricket at that time, however, was limited to the southeastern counties.

Before these matches, there were instances of teams representing a number of counties. On Thursday, 28 August 1729, a match between Edwin Stead's XI and Sir William Gage's XI was held at Penshurst Park, near Tunbridge Wells in Kent. The match had the alternative title of Kent (Stead) v Surrey, Sussex & Hampshire (Gage). It was 11-a-side and played for 100 guineas with some thousands watching. It seems to have been the first known innings victory as Gage "got (within three) in one hand, as the former did in two hands, so the Kentish men (i.e., Stead's team) threw it up". A contemporary report states that "(Thomas Waymark) turned the scale of victory, which for some years past has been generally on the Kentish side". Given a 1728 reference to the superiority of Kent in the 1720s, it would seem that only a team representing three other counties had the strength to compete against them.

Generic usage
After 1739, "England" (or "all-England") became a generic term used to denote numerous teams over the next two hundred years. They invariably have important match status, depending on the quality and/or status of their opponents. Sometimes, the all-England teams were given names like "The Rest", which more accurately describes them vis-à-vis their opponents. CricketArchive (CA) lists 29 matches involving teams called England or The Rest between 1739 and 1778. These are all important matches but only one, England v Kent in 1744, has a scorecard. The earliest important match that has been designated "first-class" by CA (i.e., coded F1) was between a Hampshire county team and one called England on Broadhalfpenny Down at Hambledon in Hampshire on 24 June 1772. CA lists all matches involving teams called England without differentiating between international and non-international, so it seems they assume the "England" team of 1772 to be a direct predecessor of the modern England Test team. Not helpfully, CA also uses the term "England XI" and has another list, starting in 1872, of matches played by this team which is currently understood to be the England national team when playing non-international matches on tour. CA's list of England XI matches begins five years before Test cricket started and most of the early matches are between a university team and what is loosely termed an England XI.

William Clarke's All-England Eleven (the AEE)
 
The name "All-England" took on a specific meaning in 1846 when William Clarke's All-England Eleven, commonly known as the AEE, was founded as a touring team of leading players, its purpose being to take advantage of the new railway network and play matches at city venues, mainly in the North of England. Clarke's team was indeed a top-class side worthy of its title as, in 1846, it consisted of himself, Joe Guy (cricketer), George Parr (all of Nottinghamshire), William Lillywhite, Jemmy Dean (both Sussex), William Denison, Will Martingell (both Surrey), Fuller Pilch, Alfred Mynn, Nicholas Wanostrocht (aka "Felix") and William Hillyer (all Kent). Their matches in Sheffield, Manchester and Leeds were a huge success and very profitable, especially for Clarke himself who was careful to pay his players more than Marylebone Cricket Club (MCC) did (from £4 to £6 per week) and so keep them interested. He kept the surplus for himself.

The AEE continued for several years to showcase the best players of the day. Subsequent additions to the squad included John Wisden of Sussex, William Dorrinton of Kent, Tom Sewell senior and his son Tom Sewell junior of Surrey. Because of its strength the AEE generally played "odds" matches against sides composed of twenty-two men, though these odds were reduced when opposed to such sides as Sheffield Cricket Club, Manchester Cricket Club and some county teams.

The AEE lasted until 1880. In all matches George Parr with 10,404 runs (av 16.78) was the leading batsman for the side and William Clarke himself took the most wickets (2,385).

United All-England Eleven (UEE)
In 1852, several players set up the United All-England Eleven (UEE) as a rival to the AEE. Clarke would have nothing to do with the UEE but he died in 1856 and, from 1857 to 1866, matches were played between these two teams which were perhaps the most important contests of the English season – certainly judged by the quality of the players.

The AEE/UEE concept expanded with the formation of other itinerant elevens, notably the United North of England Eleven (UNEE) and the United South of England Eleven (USEE), the latter showcasing W. G. Grace.

The travelling elevens ran their course over a period of some thirty seasons but interest in them waned as county cricket grew and provided matches with a more competitive edge. With the advent of international cricket in the 1870s, especially following the hugely successful inaugural Australian tour in 1878, the travelling elevens faded away.

Non-international England teams
Teams styled England and commonly referred to as all-England continued to play non-international matches into the 1880s but thereafter they tended to be given names such as The Rest because the England national team was by then well-established and understood to represent the country for the purpose of international cricket.

The earliest match involving a team styled "The Rest of England" took place at Bradford Park Avenue in June 1883 when the opposition was a composite Nottinghamshire and Yorkshire XI. The combined counties won by 6 wickets.

In the 20th century, Test trial matches were occasionally staged (the last in 1976) and these were called England v The Rest, but it is generally understood that the England of these games was the national side while The Rest formed the "all-England" element.

References

Bibliography
 

English cricket teams in the 18th century
English cricket in the 19th century
First-class cricket teams

fr:All-England Eleven